NGC Medical–OTC Industria Porte was a professional continental road bicycle racing team based in Italy that competed predominantly in UCI Europe Tour and other UCI Continental Circuits races and, when invited, in UCI ProTour events.

The team was formed in 2006 as a UCI Continental team, managed by Pier Giovanni Baldini. For the 2006 season, Daniele Masiani and Alessio Di Basco assisted as directeur sportifs. In 2007, Giuseppe Lanzoni and Gianluigi Barsottelli took over as directeur sportifs.

After the 2008 season, NGC became the cosponsor of UCI ProTour team . When no new cosponsor could be found, the team disbanded.

Major wins
2007
 Road Race Championships, Volodymyr Zagorodny
Stage 5 Tour of Slovenia, Enrico Rossi
2008
Stage 1 Giro del Trentino, Volodymyr Zagorodny
Memorial Marco Pantani, Enrico Rossi
Tour du Jura, Massimiliano Maisto

Final roster

External links
Official site 

Cycling teams based in Italy
Defunct cycling teams based in Italy
Cycling teams established in 2006
Cycling teams disestablished in 2008